Elanor Colburn (1866 - May 7, 1939) was an American painter.

References

1866 births
1939 deaths
American women painters
Painters from California
20th-century American painters
20th-century American women artists